Toshihiko is a masculine Japanese given name.

Possible writings
Toshihiko can be written using different combinations of kanji characters. Some examples:

敏彦, "agile, elegant boy"
敏比古, "agile, young man (archaic)"
俊彦, "talented, elegant boy"
俊比古, "talented, young man (archaic)"
利彦, "benefit, elegant boy"
利比古, "benefit, young man (archaic)"
年彦, "year, elegant boy"
年比古, "year, young man (archaic)"
寿彦, "long life, elegant boy"
寿比古, "long life, young man (archaic)"

The name can also be written in hiragana としひこ or katakana トシヒコ.

Notable people with the name
Toshihiko Fukui (福井 俊彦, born 1935), Japanese economist and banker.
Toshihiko Horiyama (堀山 俊彦), Japanese video game composer.
Toshihiko Itokawa (糸川 敏彦, born 1974), Japanese speed skater.
Toshihiko Iwasaki (岩崎 利彦, born 1967), Japanese hurdler.
Toshihiko Izutsu (井筒 俊彦, 1914–1993), Japanese academic and writer.
Toshihiko Kobayashi (小林 俊彦), Japanese manga artist.
Toshihiko Koga (古賀 稔彦, born 1967), Japanese judoka.
Toshihiko Kuramoto (倉本 寿彦, born 1991), Japanese baseball player.
Toshihiko Miyata (宮田 俊彦), Japanese table tennis player.
Toshihiko Nakajima (中嶋 聡彦, born 1962), Japanese voice actor.
Toshihiko Okimune (沖宗 敏彦, born 1959), Japanese footballer.
Toshihiko Sahashi (佐橋 俊彦, born 1959), Japanese composer.
Toshihiko Sakai (堺 利彦, 1871–1933), Japanese socialist, writer and historian.
Toshihiko Seki (関 俊彦, born 1962), Japanese voice actor.
Toshihiko Seko (瀬古 利彦, born 1956), Japanese long-distance runner.
Toshihiko Shimosato (下里 敏彦, born 1946), Japanese handball player.
Toshihiko Shoji (庄司 敏彦, 1909–?), Japanese ice hockey player.
Toshihiko Tahara (田原 俊彦, born 1961), Japanese idol singer.
Toshihiko Takeda (竹田 敏彦, 1891–1961), Japanese novelist.
Toshihiko Uchiyama (footballer, born 1978) (内山 俊彦), Japanese footballer.
Toshihiko Yamada (山田 敏彦, born 1932), Japanese ice hockey player.

See also
9098 Toshihiko, a main-belt asteroid

Japanese masculine given names